Dredd Vs Death is a novel written by Gordon Rennie and based on the 2003 computer game Judge Dredd: Dredd Vs. Death featuring Judge Dredd.

Synopsis
Judge Death and the Dark Judges escape from captivity and begin a massacre. A plague of zombies and vampires spreads across Mega-City One. Four psi-judges have been kidnapped. Insane scientist Dr Icarus is somehow the link between all of these events.

External links
Dredd Vs Death at the 2000 AD website.

References

Judge Dredd novels